Algawan railway station (station code AIG) is a small railway station located in Hardoi, Saharanpur in the Indian state of Uttar Pradesh. It belongs to North Central Railway, Moradabad. Nearby major railway station is Bareilly Junction railway station and airport is Amausi.

See also

 Northern Railway zone
 Hardoi
 Saharanpur Junction railway station

References 

Transport in Saharanpur
Railway stations in Saharanpur district